De 1997 a 2007 (Portuguese for "From 1997 to 2007") is a double-disc compilation album by Brazilian alternative rock band Charlie Brown Jr., released in 2008 through EMI in the wake of the 11th anniversary of the band's debut, Transpiração Contínua Prolongada. It contains a selection of their greatest hits, ranging from Transpiração Contínua Prolongada (1997) to their most recent release at the time, Ritmo, Ritual e Responsa (2007).

Following the death of vocalist Chorão in March 2013, the compilation had a significative posthumous boost on sales; according to the iTunes Store, it was the second most purchased album of the month.

Critical reception
Anderson Nascimento of Galeria Musical gave the compilation a positive rating of 3 out of 5 stars, calling it a "standard compilation recommended strictly for completionists".

Track listing

Disc one

Disc two

References

2008 compilation albums
EMI Records compilation albums
Charlie Brown Jr. albums